Herbert Redvers Cartman (28 February 1900 – 5 April 1955) was an English footballer who played as a forward. Born in Bolton, he played for Waterloo Temperance, Bolton Wanderers, Manchester United and Tranmere Rovers.

External links
Profile at StretfordEnd.co.uk
Profile at MUFCInfo.com

1900 births
1955 deaths
English footballers
Manchester United F.C. players
Bolton Wanderers F.C. players
Tranmere Rovers F.C. players
Association football forwards